Stéphane Masala (born 30 August 1976) is a French professional football manager and former player. He is currently the manager of Championnat National 2 club Créteil.

In 2018, Masala coached Les Herbiers, a third-tier side, to the Coupe de France Final, eventually being defeated 2–0 by first-tier giants Paris Saint-Germain.

Playing career 
Masala played mainly as a midfielder throughout his 19-year playing career. From 2003 to 2005, he was the captain of Orléans, and also coached one of the club's youth teams. He later played for three different seasons with Reims and Luçon in the third tier of French football, the Championnat National, but never obtained professional status as a player. Masala retired in 2014.

Managerial career 
In June 2016, after spending 11 years as a coach and a player at Luçon, Masala became the assistant manager of Les Herbiers. He took the full job of manager at the club in January 2018, after his previous colleague Reculeau had been dismissed. Initially, he was intended to be the interim manager for just two games, although his contract was later extended. In his first two months in charge, Les Herbiers won seven and drew four of their 12 matches. Masala did not have the correct coaching qualifications to manage in the Championnat National, and so Les Herbiers were fined €1,170 for every match in 2018 that he managed.

Masala coached Les Herbiers to a Coupe de France Final against Paris Saint-Germain in 2018, an underdog story that ended in a 2–0 defeat at the Stade de France. They played and defeated Chambly in the semi-finals of the competition. A few days after the Coupe de France Final, Les Herbiers were relegated from the Championnat National to the Championnat National 2. On 8 May 2020, Masala extended his contract with Les Herbiers for an additional two years.

In May 2022, Masala left Les Herbiers after six years at the club, joining Championnat National 2 side Créteil.

Personal life
Masala was born in Nantes, France. He is of Sardinian descent; his father left Sardinia when he was 16, and his mother is from Marche, Italy.

Honours

Player 
Luçon
 Championnat de France Amateur: 2012–13

Manager 
Les Herbiers
 Coupe de France runner-up: 2017–18

References

External links 
 

1976 births
Living people
Footballers from Nantes
French football managers
French footballers
Association football midfielders
French people of Sardinian descent
French people of Italian descent
ES Troyes AC players
Stade de Reims players
US Orléans players
Luçon FC players
Championnat National players
Championnat National 2 players
Championnat National 3 players